Malabar Wildlife Sanctuary is a protected area located along the Western Ghats and spread across  in  Chakkittapara and Koorachundu revenue villages of Koyilandy Taluk in Kozhikode, Kerala.
The sanctuary is part of the western ghats, a biodiversity hotspot. It also comes under the Nilgiri Biosphere Reserve and forms a part of the Wayanad Elephant Reserve.

References

External links
 Official website of Department of Forests and Wildlife Department, Government of Kerala

Wildlife sanctuaries of the Western Ghats
2010 establishments in Kerala
Protected areas established in 2010